Scott William Sauerbeck (born November 9, 1971) is a retired left-handed Major League Baseball relief pitcher.

High school career
Sauerbeck attended Northwest High School in Cincinnati, and played baseball, basketball, and soccer graduating in 1990.

He called himself "the curveball flipping freak."

College career
After attending Miami University in Oxford, Ohio, Sauerbeck was drafted by the New York Mets in the 23rd round of the 1994 amateur draft.

Professional career
After four seasons in the minor leagues, Sauerbeck was drafted by the Pittsburgh Pirates in the  Rule 5 draft. In four and a half seasons with the Pirates, he had an ERA of 3.56 and compiled a record of 19-15 with five saves in 341 games out of the bullpen.

During the  season, Sauerbeck and pitcher Mike González were traded to the Boston Red Sox for Brandon Lyon and Anastacio Martinez, but the Pirates backed out of the deal after discovering an injury to Lyon. However, the Pirates and Red Sox worked out another trade that sent Sauerbeck and Jeff Suppan to Boston for infielder Freddy Sanchez. With Boston, he pitched in 26 games and made one postseason appearance.

In the offseason, he signed with the Cleveland Indians, but missed the  season due to an injury. In June , Cleveland released him due to poor performance on the field and being arrested for permitting someone intoxicated to drive his car. Two weeks later, he signed with the Oakland Athletics. On October 10, 2006, Oakland released him.

On February 2, 2007, he signed a minor league deal with the Houston Astros. He was released by the Astros while pitching for the Round Rock Express, their Triple-A affiliate on June 19, 2007. On February 1, 2008, Sauerbeck signed a minor league contract with an invitation to spring training with the Cincinnati Reds. The Reds released him on May 6, 2008. He signed a minor league contract with the Chicago White Sox and was assigned to their Triple-A affiliate, the Charlotte Knights, later in May. Sauerbeck's final minor league game was August 29, pitching a scoreless inning with two strikeouts against the Durham Bulls. He announced his retirement following the game. With the Knights, Scott compiled a 1-2 record with a 4.37 ERA in 37 games.

External links
, or Retrosheet
Venezuelan Winter League
Sports Illustrated

1971 births
Living people
Baseball players from Cincinnati
Binghamton Mets players
Boston Red Sox players
Capital City Bombers players
Charlotte Knights players
Cleveland Indians players
Dunedin Blue Jays players
Louisville Bats players
Major League Baseball pitchers
Miami RedHawks baseball players
Nashville Sounds players
Navegantes del Magallanes players
American expatriate baseball players in Venezuela
Norfolk Tides players
Oakland Athletics players
Pittsburgh Pirates players
Pittsfield Mets players
Round Rock Express players
Sacramento River Cats players
St. Lucie Mets players
Stockton Ports players
Syracuse Chiefs players